The Dutch Society for Sexual Reform (NVSH) is a Dutch sexual advocacy organization. The NVSH was founded in 1946, as the successor of the Dutch Neo-Malthusian League, a birth control organisation which opened the first birth control clinic in the world in 1881, in Amsterdam. The NVSH was once the only source of condoms in the Netherlands.

Up to the 1960s, a great deal of energy went into building up the organisation, which in its heyday ran over 60 birth control clinics in The Netherlands. Much work in those early years was put into improving the quality and availability of contraceptives (condom, diaphragm and spermicidal jelly). In 1966 the society  reached a membership of 220,000. Contraceptives were officially legalized in 1970, after which membership began to fall. In 2002, the number was about 1500 and late 2008 about 700.

According to its website, the NVSH aims at what it calls the sexual emancipation of individuals and the improvement of sexual conditions in society, including:

The NVSH website states that they advocate acceptance of all forms of human sexuality, including those forms that are commonly labeled "abnormal". The website states that NVSH considers the use of the label "normal" to be "problematic", with regard to sexual practices such as premarital sex, adultery, homosexuality, masturbation, oral and anal sex, zoophilia, and pedophilia.

See also

 COC Nederland
 Vereniging Martijn

References

 Gé Nabrink, Seksuele Hervorming in Nederland, 1881–1971, SUN, Nijmegen, 1978.
 The sexual system

External links
 

Sexuality and society
Sex positivism
Medical and health organisations based in the Netherlands
1946 establishments in the Netherlands
Organizations established in 1946
Pedophile advocacy